This is a list of seasons completed by the Coventry Blaze ice hockey team, presently of the British Elite League.

This list documents the season-by-season records of the Coventry Blaze since their relocation to Coventry from Solihull in 2000 to the present day.

Key

Seasons

Notes

External links
An ongoing history of the Nottingham Panthers by Peter Walch
Ice Hockey Results & Tables - Malcolm Preen

 
England sport-related lists
Coventry-related lists